Kiaban (also Romanized as Kīābān) is a village in Rud Pish Rural District, in the Central District of Fuman County, Gilan Province, Iran. At the 2006 census, its population was 505, in 133 families.

References 

Populated places in Fuman County